Western Hills High School may refer to:

Western Hills High School (Frankfort, Kentucky)
Western Hills High School (Benbrook, Texas)
Western Hills High School (Cincinnati, Ohio)